This is a list of chapters and colonies of the North American college fraternity Phi Gamma Delta.

Chapters 
Active chapters are indicated in bold. Inactive chapters are indicated in italic. Schools that have closed also shown in italics.

Notes

Colonies 
Phi Gamma Delta has colonies at the following universities:

References

External links 
 Official Site

Phi Gamma Delta
Phi Gamma Delta